Richard Hugo Kaho (15 November 1885 Pärnu – 17 September 1964 Hamburg) was an Estonian plant physiologist and politician. He was a member of VI Riigikogu (its National Council). From 1938 until 1940, he was the rector of the University of Tartu.

References

1885 births
1964 deaths
Estonian botanists
Members of the Riiginõukogu
Riga Technical University alumni
Academic staff of the University of Tartu
Rectors of the University of Tartu
Estonian World War II refugees
Estonian emigrants to Germany
People from Pärnu
Politicians from Pärnu